The 2020 AFA Senior Male League was the 21st season of the AFA Senior Male League, the men's football league in Anguilla. The season began on February 1, 2020 and was suspended on March 15, 2020 due to the ongoing COVID-19 pandemic. The season resumed behind closed doors on June 17, 2020 with the regular season concluding on July 1, 2020.

Roaring Lions won the AFA League by winning the championship over Doc's United, 3–0 on July 12, 2020.

Teams

Stadiums and locations 

Note: Table lists in alphabetical order.

Table

Playoffs

Bracket

Results

Semifinals

Third place

Final

Commissioner's Cup 

The 2020 AFA League Commmssioner's Cup was a knockout tournament held in Anguilla ahead of the 2020 AFA Senior Male League. The tournament consisted of three teams and was played from 27 January to 31 January 2020.

Enforcers won the Cup, beating Doc's United on penalties after extra time.

References 

2020
2019–20 in Caribbean football leagues
2020–21 in Caribbean football leagues
Association football events postponed due to the COVID-19 pandemic